Titanium La Portada is an office building in Santiago, Chile. Located in the capital's high-end financial district of El Golf, it is the second tallest skyscraper in the country. Construction began in January 2007, and was completed in January 2010. It was surpassed in height by the then unfinished Gran Torre Santiago in November 2010. It was officially inaugurated on May 3, 2010. The architects are Abraham Senerman and Andrés Weil.

Form 
The seven underground floors are used primarily for parking. There are two helipads on top of the building. By 2010, Titanium La Portada is expected to be the 13th tallest building in Latin America.

Other details 
Construction began in January 2007 with an investment of US$120 million, and its inauguration was expected in December 2008. Primary materials used include aluminum, reinforced concrete, steel, granite and glass curtain wall. The tower did not suffer any damage from the earthquake in February 2010, although one of the decorative fixtures in the exterior did collapse.

The space occupied by the building was formerly an upscale shopping mall, the Portada de Vitacura. So as to integrate well with the surrounding area, 70% of the ground level will be open to pedestrians, and much will be green space and recreational.

Titanium La Portada is the first project in South America to be certified green in the LEED rating system by the US Green Building Council.

See also
List of tallest buildings in South America
Costanera Center

References

External links 

Buildings and structures in Santiago
Skyscrapers in Chile
Office buildings completed in 2010
Skyscraper office buildings
Office buildings in Chile